Pterolophia borneensis is a species of beetle in the family Cerambycidae. It was described by Warren Samuel Fisher in 1935. It is known from Borneo.

References

borneensis
Beetles described in 1935